The Norwegian Medicines Agency (Statens legemiddelverk, Legemiddelverket) is the national, regulatory authority for new and existing medicines and the supply chain. The Agency is responsible for supervising the production, trials and marketing of medicines. It approves medicines and monitors their use, and ensures cost-efficient, effective and well-documented use of medicines. The inspectorate also supervises the supply-chain and regulates prices and trade conditions for pharmacies.

Sources
The Norwegian Medicines Agency

Medicines Agency
Pharmacy in Norway
National agencies for drug regulation
Regulators of biotechnology products
Drugs in Norway
Medical and health organisations based in Norway
Regulation in Norway